is a Japanese anthology original video animation (OVA) and anime film released in 1987.

The film consists of nine shorts by different well-known directors, many of whom started out as animators with little to no directing experience. Each has a distinctive animation style and story, ranging from comedic to dramatic storylines. The music was composed by Joe Hisaishi and Isaku Fujita and arranged by Joe Hisaishi, Isaku Fujita, and Masahisa Takeichi.

Segments

"Opening" / "Ending"
The  takes place in a desert. A boy finds a small "coming soon" poster advertising the Robot Carnival, and becomes frightened and agitated. He warns the people in his village, most likely to escape, when a huge machine with many robots performing in niches on its exterior grinds its way right over the village. Once a magnificent traveling showcase, it is now heavily rusted, damaged by decades of weathering in the desert, while its many machines wreak havoc as the village is destroyed beneath its might.

In the  segment (the ninth segment of the OVA), the Robot Carnival is stopped by a dune in the desert. Unable to climb it, the Carnival stalls at its base. As the sun sets over the traveling relic, flashback stills recall the grandeur of the Carnival at the peak of its existence – an unparalleled engine of mirth that brought timeless joy to the various cities it visited. At sunrise, the gigantic machine charges forward with a burst of power, and surmounts the dune. The final push proves to be too much for the aged contraption, and it finally goes to pieces in the desert. The bulk of the OVA's credits are then shown concluding with an epilogue.

In the epilogue at the end of the credits, set several years later, a man discovers an orb among the remains and brings it back to his family. It is a music box, featuring one of the carnival’s robot ballerinas. As it dances, the children applaud. The ballerina finishes its dance with a leap into the air; the explosion that follows destroys the shack where the family lived, leaving "END" in enormous letters lying in its place. The family's pet llama, seemingly the only survivor, struggles to regain its footing.

Staff
Director / Scenario / Storyboards: Katsuhiro Otomo, Atsuko Fukushima
Backgrounds: Nizō Yamamoto
Sound Effects: Kazutoshi Satō

"Franken's Gears"
 was directed by Kōji Morimoto. A mad scientist tries to give life to his robot with lightning, just like Victor Frankenstein did. During a vicious thunderstorm, the robot is successfully brought to life, and mimics his creator's every movement. Overjoyed, the scientist dances with glee, trips, and falls. Seeing this, the robot dances, trips, and falls on the scientist, killing him.

Staff
Director / Scenario / Character Designer: Koji Morimoto
Backgrounds: Yūji Ikehata
Sound Effects: Kazutoshi Satō

"Deprive"
In "Deprive", an alien invasion of robot foot soldiers attacks a city and kidnaps people, including a young girl. Her companion, an android, is damaged, but retains her locket. A human with superhuman abilities is then seen; he goes through waves of robots before being stopped by two powerful robots. Captured by the alien leader, he is tortured, but it is also revealed to be the android from earlier, now upgraded into a combat android with a human disguise. Defeating the two powerful robots and the alien leader, he rescues the girl. Running through the wasteland carrying her, the girl eventually wakes up and recognizes his new form because of the locket he still has.

Staff
Director / Scenario / Character Designer: Hidetoshi Ōmori
Backgrounds: Kenji Matsumoto
Sound Effects: Jun'ichi Sasaki

"Presence"
, one of only two segments featuring intelligible dialogue, tells the story of a man who has an obsession with a gynoid he has been secretly constructing in an attempt to compensate for the lack of any close relationship with his wife and family. The setting seems to be British and of the early twentieth century, but also suggests another planet or a future which has attempted to re-establish a former social structure. When the gynoid takes on a personality of her own, far beyond what the man had programmed, he smashes her in a fit of panic, and leaves his secret laboratory for what he believes is the last time. Twenty years later, the man has a vision of his gynoid appearing before him, but then blowing up before he can take her hand. He returns to his shed to find the gynoid still sitting smashed in a corner, just as she had been left years earlier. Another twenty years elapse, and the gynoid appears again before the man. This time, he takes her hand and walks into the distance with her, before vanishing in front of his shocked wife.

Little of the dialogue is actually spoken on-screen; all but a few lines are given in voice-over, or with the speaker's mouth obscured.

Staff
Director / Scenario / Character Designer: Yasuomi Umetsu
Animation Production Assistance: Shinsuke Terasawa, Hideki Nimura
Backgrounds: Hikaru Yamakawa
Sound Effects: Kenji Mori

Main cast

"Star Light Angel"
"Star Light Angel" is a bishōjo story featuring two friends – teenage girls – at a robot-themed amusement park. One of the girls finds that her boyfriend is now going out with her friend. Running away in tears, she finds her way to a virtual reality ride. Though pleasant at first, her memory causes the ride to summon a giant laser-breathing mecha. One of the park's robots, actually a human park employee in costume, finds himself in the role of knight in shining armor, allowing her to let go of her darker emotions, and to move forward in her life. The mood of this segment was heavily influenced by the music video for A-ha's "Take On Me."

Note: some cameos of Akira movie characters appear in the background characters

Staff
Director / Scenario / Character Designer: Hiroyuki Kitazume
Backgrounds: Yui Shimazaki
Sound Effects: Kenji Mori

"Cloud"
"Cloud" features a robot walking through time, and the evolution of man. The backdrop is animated with clouds that depict various events of the universe, such as the modernization of man as well as the self-destruction of man. Eventually, the same angel who cries for his immortality makes him human towards the end. The animation is done in a scratchboard or rough etching style.

Staff
Director / Scenario / Character Designer / Backgrounds / Key Animation: Manabu Ōhashi (as "Mao Lamdo")
Animation: Hatsune Ōhashi, Shiho Ōhashi
Sound Effects: Swara Pro
Music: Isaku Fujita

"Strange Tales of Meiji Machine Culture: Westerner's Invasion"
 is set in the nineteenth century and features two "giant robots", directed from within by a human crew. In the style of a movie serial of the sound era, a Westerner in his giant robot attempts to take over Japan, but is challenged by locals operating a "machine made for the parade" – a Japanese giant robot. The style of this segment is somewhat reminiscent of a Japanese World War II-era propaganda film. Despite the title of this segment, there is no known prequel or sequel. The Westerner speaks English in the original release.

Staff
Director / Scenario: Hiroyuki Kitakubo
Character Designer: Yoshiyuki Sadamoto
Mechanical Designer: Mahiro Maeda
Animation Assistance: Kazuaki Mōri, Yuji Moriyama, Kumiko Kawana
Backgrounds: Hiroshi Sasaki
Sound Effects: Jun'ichi Sasaki

Cast

"Chicken Man and Red Neck"
 is set in the city of Tokyo, overrun by its machines, which have been turned into robots of all shapes and sizes by a robotic magician, the titular Red Neck. They all come alive for a night of revelry, with only a single, drunken human (Chicken Man) awake to witness it. When the sun rises, the robots disappear, and everything is turned back to normal, but Chicken Man awakens to find that the now-restored machines are embedded high up in a set of skyscrapers, while the citizens of Tokyo go about their lives far below.

Staff
Director / Scenario / Character Designer: Takashi Nakamura
Backgrounds: Hiroshige Sawai
Sound Effects: Junichi Sasaki

Release
The OVA was released in Japan on VHS and LaserDisc on July 21, 1987, through JVC. Streamline Pictures producer Carl Macek licensed the OVA and released it in theaters and on video in North America in the late 1980s.

A limited-edition Region 2 DVD of Robot Carnival was released in Japan through Beam Entertainment in November 2000. A Region 1 DVD of Robot Carnival was released in the United States by Discotek Media in 2015 and a Blu-ray was released in 2018.

Streamline Pictures English dub

The script for the English-dubbed version of "A Tale of Two Robots" is slightly different from the original Japanese version and even adds a few lines that are not present in the original version. In addition, a passing reference to Japan's 1854 opening to foreign trade is removed and the foreign antagonist's English dialogue is re-recorded.

Some versions of the English-dub of the release by Streamline Pictures shuffled the order of the segments and modified the "Ending" segment by removing the still images of the "Robot Carnival," placing the two animated segments next to each other, and placing all of the credits at the very end of the OVA. The still images of the "Robot Carnival" were most likely removed due to Streamline's practice of removing all onscreen kanji from their anime releases in order to "Americanize" them. Carl Macek stated with certainty that the reason for the "shuffling of segments" was due to considerations regarding the theatrical exploitation of the OVA.

The various segments were received separately and then subsequently assembled to fill out 2000 ft reels. In order to keep the actual distribution of the theatrical release in a manageable state, the segments were arranged to minimize reel changes – otherwise, it would have required additional reels (and therefore, additional reel changes) to keep the product in its original order and would have added to the cost of the distribution. The decision was mutually agreed upon between Streamline and APPP regarding the credit sequence and the use of still images – the original production company did not have the proper neutral closing credits required for international distribution available; therefore, it was mutually decided to create this new closing.

See also

 List of package films
 Neo Tokyo – an Otomo anthology film from 1987.
 Memories – an Otomo anthology film from 1995. 
 Genius Party – anthology films from 2007 and 2008.
 Short Peace – an Otomo anthology film from 2013.

References

External links

Anime News Network'''s "Buried Treasure" article on Robot Carnival''

1987 anime OVAs
Alien invasions in films
Anime with original screenplays
Circus films
Discotek Media
Films directed by Kōji Morimoto
Films set in the 19th century
Films set in amusement parks
Films set in deserts
Films set in Japan
Films set in Tokyo
Films set in the United Kingdom
Fiction about immortality
Japanese anthology films
Mad scientist films
Mecha anime and manga
Animated anthology films
Robot films